Southern Pacific Railroad's AC-10 class was the largest class of cab forward steam locomotives produced for the railroad.  The design of this and the previous AC classes proved so successful for SP that the railroad began placing orders for the AC-10's successors, AC-11s, while Baldwin Locomotive Works was still busy building and delivering the AC-10s.  Mechanically, the AC-10s were exceptionally similar to their immediate predecessors, the AC-8s.

The first AC-10, number 4205, entered service on February 17, 1942, and the last, 4244, on August 19, 1942.  SP used these locomotives for about fifteen years, with the first retirements of this class (three locomotives) occurring on April 5, 1955 and the last (three more of the class) on September 24, 1958.  The locomotives were scrapped soon after they were retired, with the last one, number 4243, scrapped on August 7, 1959.

References 
 

AC-10
4-8-8-2 locomotives
Baldwin locomotives
Simple articulated locomotives
Railway locomotives introduced in 1942
Steam locomotives of the United States
Scrapped locomotives
Standard gauge locomotives of the United States
Cab forward steam locomotives 
Freight locomotives